Kildare is an unincorporated community in Cass County, Texas, United States.

The Linden-Kildare Consolidated Independent School District serves area students.

Notable people
Cliff Bell, Negro league player.
Shock Linwood, Baylor University's running back.

External links
 

Unincorporated communities in Texas
Unincorporated communities in Cass County, Texas